The Lyric is the oldest extant literary magazine in North America devoted to formal poetry.

The journal was established by Norfolk-based poet John R. Moreland in 1921, and was published by the Norfolk Poets' Club until 1928.  By 1949 it had moved to New York City, and was being published by the Lyric Foundation, an organization founded by the magazine's third editor, Virginia Kent Cummins.  After Cummins' death editorship passed to Ruby Altizer Roberts, poet laureate of Virginia.

Contributors
The journal has featured works by the following notable poets:
Henry Bellamann
Gamaliel Bradford
Alma Denny
Emily Dickinson
Robert Hillyer
Aline Kilmer
Walter de la Mare

References

External links
The Lyric

Poetry magazines published in the United States
Magazines established in 1921
Magazines published in New York (state)
Magazines published in Virginia
Mass media in Norfolk, Virginia